The 2013 Louisiana Swashbucklers season was the ninth season for the professional indoor football franchise and their second in the Professional Indoor Football League (PIFL). The Swashbucklers were one of seven teams that competed in the PIFL for the 2013 season.

The team played their home games under head coach Darnell Lee at the Sudduth Coliseum in Lake Charles, Louisiana. The Swashbucklers earned a 5–6 record, placing fifth in the league, failing to qualify for the playoffs.

Schedule
Key:

Regular season
All start times are local to home team

Roster

Division standings

References

External links
2013 results

Louisiana Swashbucklers
Louisiana Swashbucklers
Louisiana Swashbucklers